Lily Hoy Price grew up in Quesnel, British Columbia and is the ninth daughter of twelve children in the Hoy family. She has lived in England, Nigeria, Uganda and Nova Scotia.

At 70, she took a creative-writing workshop at North Island College and started setting down her life story. Her writing has been published in Ricepaper magazine and in the collection of essays, Verve (2006). Her first book is I Am Full Moon: Stories of a Ninth Daughter, stylishly published by Brindle & Glass. The photos are by her father, Chow Dong Hoy, who documented the Cariboo through much of the 20th century.

Lily is a member of the Federation of BC Writers, the Comox Valley Writer's Society and the Valley Women of Words (out of Comox Valley). Lily also participated in the 2009 Sunshine Coast Festival of the Written Arts as one of "20 new voices", along with Rebecca Hendry, who is also published by Brindle & Glass. She lives in Courtenay, BC.

References 

1930 births
Living people
Canadian writers of Asian descent
Canadian memoirists
Canadian people of Chinese descent
Writers from British Columbia
Canadian women memoirists